Paul Greco (October 21, 1955 – December 17, 2008) was an American actor and musician.

Biography
Greco is best known for his role as Sully, the leader of the Orphans gang, in the 1979 film The Warriors. He appeared in a number of films throughout the 1980s and 1990s, and also appeared in an episode of Miami Vice in 1986.

He died from lung cancer on December 17, 2008, aged 53.

Filmography

External links
 

1955 births
2008 deaths
20th-century American musicians
20th-century American male actors
American people of Italian descent
American male film actors
American male television actors
Deaths from lung cancer in New York (state)
Male actors from Newark, New Jersey
Musicians from New Jersey